Gopaul is surname and given name and may refer to:

Surname
Didier Gopaul (born 1983), Mauritian football player
Sen Gopaul (born 1957), Guyanese cricketer
Shea Gopaul, American writer

Given name
Gopaul Sahadeo (born 1952), Trinidadian cricketer

References

Surnames of Mauritian origin
Surnames of Guyanese origin
Trinidadian given names